Hazurov is a Bulgarian surname. Notable people with the surname include:

Borislav Hazurov (born 1985), Bulgarian footballer
Kostadin Hazurov (born 1985), Bulgarian footballer

Bulgarian-language surnames